Events from the year 1984 in Ireland.

Incumbents
 President: Patrick Hillery
 Taoiseach: Garret FitzGerald (Fine Gael)
 Tánaiste: Dick Spring (Labour Party)
 Minister for Finance: Alan Dukes (Fine Gael) 
 Chief Justice: Tom O'Higgins
 Dáil: 24th
 Seanad: 17th

Events
 1 January –
 The Department of Posts and Telegraphs split into An Post and Telecom Éireann.
 Galway City began celebrations marking its mayoral status granted by King Richard III in 1484.
 10 January – Seán MacEntee, founder member of the Fianna Fáil party and former Tánaiste, died aged 94. He was the last surviving member of the First Dáil.
 31 January – Ann Lovett, aged 15, died after giving birth to a boy in a grotto in Granard, County Longford. Reporting on the incident on The Gay Byrne Show uncovered many stories from listeners of rape, abortion and sexual abuse.
 14 March – Sinn Féin MP Gerry Adams was shot and wounded in Belfast.
 29 March – The Licensed Vintners Association voted to abolish the Holy Hour in pubs and hotels in Dublin and Cork which close for one hour between 2.30 pm and 3.30 pm. The Hour was introduced during the 1920s by Minister for Justice Kevin O’Higgins.
 2 May – The New Ireland Forum, convened to address the war in Northern Ireland, published its report presenting three possibilities for discussion: a unitary Irish state, a federal/confederal state, and joint sovereignty.
 Visit by Ronald Reagan
 1 June – United States President Ronald Reagan arrived at Shannon Airport to begin a state visit.
 2 June – Reagan was at Galway, Ballyporeen (his ancestral home), and the Phoenix Park in Dublin.
 3 June – Ten thousand people protested outside Reagan's state banquet in Dublin Castle.
 4 June – Reagan addressed a joint session of the houses of the Oireachtas.
 18 June – European Parliament elections were held in Ireland and Northern Ireland.
 13 July – The Ford Motor Company assembly plant in Cork closed. The closure of the Dunlop tyre factory in the same city had been announced previously and the Verolme Cork Dockyard was closed as a shipbuilder at the end of the year.
 14 July – The Columban missionary Niall O'Brien, who was imprisoned in the Philippines, was released.
 17 July – Some workers in Dunnes Stores in Henry Street, Dublin refused to handle South African produce as a protest against apartheid.
 19 July – The strongest earthquake ever recorded in Ireland, the 5.4 magnitude Llŷn Peninsula earthquake near Caernarvon in Wales, rocked the Irish eastern seaboard and was felt by many in Dublin. Numerous aftershocks occurred over the following month.
 23 July – The Dublin Area Rapid Transit (DART) rail service between Howth and Bray was inaugurated.
 28 September – The Dublin telephone system collapsed due to network overload as a result of a phone-in competition on the illegal radio station, Radio Nova.
 1 October – Queen Elizabeth II of the United Kingdom presented a Royal Charter to the University of Ulster.
 5 October – Women workers in Dunnes Stores in Dublin, who were on strike for the previous 11 weeks in support of a dispute over the handling of South African fruit, began a sit-in at the store.
 12 October – Brighton hotel bombing – The Irish Republican Army killed five people in a bomb attack at the Grand Hotel in Brighton, England during the British Tory Party annual conference, narrowly missing Prime Minister Margaret Thatcher.
 22 October – The first stage of the new Rice Bridge over the River Suir in Waterford was opened to road traffic.
 5 November – The RTÉ Radio current affairs programme, Morning Ireland, was broadcast for the first time.
 14 November – Irish Shipping Limited was placed in liquidation.
 8 November – RTÉ Television's first newsreader, Charles Mitchel, delivered his final news bulletin.
 2 December – European Economic Community heads of government visited President Hillery and Mrs. Hillery at the President's residence, Áras an Uachtaráin.
 7 December – The most sophisticated naval vessel ever built in the country, the £25 million LÉ Eithne, was commissioned at the Haulbowline naval base.

Arts and literature
 May – The Irish Film Theatre in Dublin closed at the end of the month due to insufficient box-office revenue.
 24 June – The Campaign for Nuclear Disarmament (CND) Solstice Rock Festival took place at Saint Anne's Park in Raheny, Dublin.
 8 July – The Slane Concert was headlined by Bob Dylan with support from In Tua Nua, UB40, and Santana, and with guests Van Morrison and Bono.
 October – Ronan Sheehan was awarded the Rooney Prize for Irish Literature.
 18 October – Van Morrison was in concert at the Simmonscourt Extension of the Royal Dublin Society.
 31 October – The annual Oíche Shamhna fancy dress Céili Mór was held in Kilronan on the island of Inis Mór.
 December – Pat Murphy's film Anne Devlin was released, starring Brid Brennan, with Bosco Hogan as Robert Emmet.
 The literary Kate O'Brien Weekend in Limerick was celebrated for the first time.

Sport

Association football
Cork City F.C. founded and elected to the League of Ireland Premier Division. Former Chelsea and Cork Celtic hero Bobby Tambling was the first manager appointed.

Golf
The Irish Open won by Bernhard Langer (West Germany).

Horse racing
Irish Grand National steeplechase won by Bentom Boy ridden by Mrs Ann Ferris, the first woman winner.

Births
2 January – Denis Behan, soccer player.
6 January – Stephen Elliott, soccer player.
10 January – Alan McCormack, soccer player.
10 February – John Fitzgerald, soccer player.
21 February – Damien Molony, television actor.
22 February – Tommy Bowe, international rugby player.
4 March – Kevin O'Brien, cricketer.
8 March – Nora Jane Noone, actress.
16 March – Aisling Bea, born Aisling O'Sullivan, actress, comedian and writer.
17 March – David Collins, Galway hurler.
4 April – Willie O'Dwyer, Kilkenny hurler.
7 April – Bryan Cullen, Dublin Gaelic footballer.
11 April – Michael Cussen, Cork hurler.
17 April – Rosanna Davison, model, Miss World 2003.
18 April – Killian O'Sullivan, actor.
13 May – Mark O'Brien, soccer player.
4 June – Kevin Hartnett, Cork hurler.
11 June – Andy Lee, boxer.
25 June – Killian Donnelly, stage actor
2 July – Ger O'Brien, soccer player.
5 July – Paul Keegan, soccer player.
21 August – Conor Kenna, soccer player.
6 September – Brian Murray, Limerick hurler.
12 October – Anthony Nash, Cork hurler.
19 November – Stephen Bradley, soccer player.
30 November – Andrew O'Shaughnessy, Limerick hurler.
18 December – Katie Walsh, jump jockey.
31 December – Anthony Flood, soccer player.
Full date unknown – Pamela Fitzgerald, camogie player.

Deaths

10 January – Seán MacEntee, Fianna Fáil TD and Tánaiste from 1959 to 1965 (born 1889).
24 January – Bernard Cowen, Fianna Fáil TD and Minister of State (born 1932).
30 January – Luke Kelly, singer, folk musician and member of the band The Dubliners (born 1940).
11 February – Theodore William Moody, historian (born 1907).
3 March – Rinty Monaghan, world flyweight boxing championship (born 1920).
19 March – Charlie Ware, Waterford hurler (born 1900).
24 March – Fintan Kennedy, General President of IT&GWU, member of the Seanad from 1969 to 1981.
6 April – Jimmy Kennedy, songwriter (born 1902).
26 April – Kathleen Behan, mother of Brendan Behan (born 1889).
June – Alec Mackie, soccer player (born 1903).
21 July – Paddy Grace, former Kilkenny hurler (born 1917).
8 August – Denis Johnston, dramatist (born 1901).
13 August – Jack Lawrence, cricketer (born 1904).
7 September – Liam O'Flaherty, novelist and short story writer (born 1896).
15 September – Charles Lynch, pianist (born 1906).
4 November – Fintan Coogan Snr, Fine Gael TD (born 1910).
29 December – Robert Farren (Roibeárd Ó Faracháin), poet (born 1909).
30 December – William Bedell Stanford, classical scholar and senator (born 1911).

See also
1984 in Irish television

References

 
1980s in Ireland
Years of the 20th century in Ireland
Ireland